James Ross McKenzie (17 August 1875 – 18 May 1945) was a Scottish professional footballer who played as an outside-forward for various clubs in Scotland and England in the 1890s.

Football career
McKenzie was born in Glasgow and trained as an upholsterer, playing amateur football for various clubs in the northern half of the city before moving to England in September 1896 to join Burton Swifts of the Football League Second Division.

At Burton he had a successful season, missing only four league matches, scoring five goals, as the Swifts finished the 1896–97 season in eleventh place. He then returned to Glasgow to spend a season with Clyde, at the end of which they finished at the foot of the table.

In the summer of 1898, he was persuaded to move to southern England to join the Southern League champions, Southampton. The "Saints" were about to embark on their first season in their new stadium and McKenzie made his debut for Southampton in the opening match at The Dell, against Brighton United on 3 September 1898.

After Watty Keay had opened the scoring, McKenzie (playing at outside-left) missed some good chances as the Saints put pressure on the Brighton goal. As half-time approached, McKenzie made a "smart run up the left" and crossed for Abe Hartley to score the second goal. McKenzie then added a third in the second half, and although Brighton pulled one back through Roddy McLeod, Tom Smith wrapped the match up with the fourth goal.

The appreciative Saints fans dubbed McKenzie "little Joe Turner", but after only six appearances the lightweight, diminutive winger lost his place to George Seeley. Following a serious leg injury in  reserve team match, he returned to Scotland, rejoining Clyde once he had recovered.

Honours
Southampton
Southern League champions: 1898–99

References

1875 births
1945 deaths
Footballers from Glasgow
Scottish footballers
Association football wingers
East Stirlingshire F.C. players
Burton Swifts F.C. players
Clyde F.C. players
Southampton F.C. players
Scottish Football League players
English Football League players
Southern Football League players
Cowlairs F.C. players
Upholsterers